The Battle of Błonie, also known as the Battle of Zawady, was a battle fought on 12 February 1770, during the War of the Bar Confederation, near the town of Błonie, near Warsaw. It was fought between forces of the Bar Confederation, and the Imperial Russian Army of the Tsardom of Russia. The Bar Confederates lost the battle against Russian forces, while heading towards Warsaw, from the Greater Poland. The defeat marked the end of major offensive operations of the Bar Confederation.

References 

Blonie
1770 in Poland
History of Masovia
Bar Confederation
Blonie
Blonie